Serhii Pavlov (born 18 July 1997) is a Ukrainian professional basketball player for Śląsk Wrocław of the PLK.

Professional career
Pavlov joined BC Dnipro in 2021 and averaged 10.5 points, 5.1 rebounds, and 1.1 assists per game. On March 12, 2022, he signed with Club Melilla Baloncesto of the LEB Oro. In September 2022 he signed with BC Pärnu Sadam.

On January 17, 2023, he signed with Śląsk Wrocław of the PLK.

National team
He represented the Ukraine at multiple international tournaments at both junior and senior level. He took part in the 2019 FIBA Basketball World Cup qualification and the 2013 FIBA Europe Under-16 Championship.

He also played at the 2019 Summer Universiade where he helped win the silver medal.

Personal
Pavlov is originally from Donetsk. He started basketball in the second grade. He hails from a famity of athletes as his mother is a basketball player while his father practices pentathlon.

References

External links
Profile at FIBA.basketball
Profile at Eurobasket.com
Profile at Proballers.com
Profile at RealGM

1997 births
Living people
BC Donetsk players
BC Dnipro players
BC Khimik players
KK Pärnu players
BC Pieno žvaigždės players
Kyiv-Basket players
Medalists at the 2019 Summer Universiade
Power forwards (basketball)
Śląsk Wrocław basketball players
Sportspeople from Donetsk
Sportspeople from Makiivka
Ukrainian expatriate basketball people in Lithuania
Ukrainian men's basketball players
Universiade medalists in basketball
Universiade silver medalists for Ukraine